Jean Michel Claude Richard (16 August 1787 – 1868) was a noted French botanist and plant collector active in Senegal, Madagascar, Mauritius, and Réunion, and a Chevalier of the Légion d'honneur.

Richard was born in Volon, Haute-Saône. He was sent to Senegal in 1816 as the colony's gardener-in-chief, but served without obvious distinction until the arrival in 1822 of Baron Jacques-François Roger (1787–1849) who entrusted to Richard the creation of an experimental garden on the left bank of the Sénégal River, near the village of Nghiao, and named it Richard Toll (toll means "garden" in the Wolof language). Richard was responsible for all plants, buildings, and facilities, and under his direction a number of new species were introduced to Senegal, including bananas, manioc, oranges, sugar cane, and coffee. In February 1824 Richard was sent to Cayenne. Directed on 30 July 1824 to keep a diary of his experiences, he developed a catalog of the garden's species, and left Senegal in 1825.

In January 1831 Richard became second director of the Jardin du Roy (now the Jardin de l'État) in the Île Bourbon (now Réunion), succeeding Nicolas Bréon. Under his leadership the garden achieved its golden age. He introduced some 3,000 plant species to the colony, by his reckoning, while studying cryptogams, ferns, and orchids. He also sent lichens from Mauritius to the German specialist Ferdinand Christian Gustav Arnold (1828–1901).

In retrospect, Richard's life has been marred by controversy. In 1841, when the young slave Edmond Albius (1829–1880) discovered the process of hand-pollination of vanilla, Richard claimed to have discovered the technique three or four years earlier. His story created serious doubts about Albius' claims, despite the support for Albius of Féréol Marie Bellier de Beaumont (1759–1831), naturalist Eugène Volcy Focard, and Méziaires of Lepervanche. By the end of the 20th century, Albius was considered the true discoverer.

Note  

 Other botanists called Richard are:
 Louis-Claude Marie Richard (1754-1821), 
 Achille Richard (1794-1852), his son (A.Rich.)
 Olivier Jules Richard (1836-1896) (O.J.Rich.)
 Claude Richard fl.(C.Rich)
 Joseph Herve Pierre Richard (J.H.P.Rich.)

Selected works 
 Catalogue du jardin de La Réunion, 1 vol. in 8°, 113 pages, 1856.

References 

 Guillaume Grandidier, Bibliographie de Madagascar, vol. 2, Comité de Madagascar, 1935, page 862.
 Aluka entry
 Visite du Jardin du Roy (French)
 RFO article on Edmond Albius (French), 29 May 2006

French taxonomists
1787 births
1868 deaths
Botanists active in Africa
18th-century French botanists
19th-century French botanists